Edgar Angeli (11 May 1892 – 17 June 1945) was a Croatian rear admiral who served as the commander of the Navy of the Independent State of Croatia between 1943 and 1944.

Biography 

Angeli was born in 1892 in Karlovac, Austria-Hungary, Angeli attended the Naval Academy of Austrian-Hungarian. As a naval officer, he participated in World War I serving in the fleet based in Rijeka.

In 1919 he was assigned to War Navy of Kingdom of Serbs, Croats and Slovenes, holding the rank of lieutenant commander. He later rose to the rank of Captain while commanding a river fleet, and witnessed the capitulation of Kingdom of Yugoslavia. Because of his connections with Croatian officers who supported the Ustaše and Slavko Kvaternik, he became an officer of the newly formed Navy of the Independent State of Croatia becoming its deputy commander from 10 April 1941 – 14 April 1943. For these actions, the Yugoslav Government in exile declared him a traitor and deprived him of his former Naval rank.

In the Croatian Navy, he continued to command a river fleet and also commanded a coastal port gendarmerie. He participated in the creation of the Croatian Naval Legion which served with the Kriegsmarine on the Black Sea and Azov Sea. He also broke the Treaty of Rome, signed by Ante Pavelić and Benito Mussolini, forbidding Croatia from building any sort of naval fleet. For his merits and war records he was decorated with the Order of the Crown of King Zvonimir 3rd Class, on 13 June 1942 from Poglavnik Ante Pavelić.

On 17 September 1943, he was promoted to the rank of Rear Admiral, becoming a commander of the Croatian Navy.

By 21 April 1944, he requested that he be allowed to retire his commission due to a prolonged illness. In May 1945 he was taken by the British Army to Bleiburg, the town where most of the early Yugoslavian War Crimes trials were held, mainly against Yugoslav Partisans. He was subsequently imprisoned by the Partisans and put on trial. He died at some point in 1945.

References

Sources
 
 

1892 births
1945 deaths
People from Karlovac
Croatian people of Jewish descent
People from the Kingdom of Croatia-Slavonia
Austro-Hungarian Navy officers
Austro-Hungarian military personnel of World War I
Royal Yugoslav Navy personnel of World War II
Croatian collaborators with Nazi Germany
Croatian admirals
Croatian Home Guard personnel
Executed Yugoslav collaborators with Nazi Germany
Executed Croatian people
Croatian Austro-Hungarians
Recipients of the Order of the Crown of King Zvonimir